KJCD-LP (92.9 FM) is a radio station licensed to serve the community of Pine Ridge, South Dakota. The station is owned by Restoration Radio Ministries Inc. It airs a Christian radio format.

The station was assigned the KJCD-LP call letters by the Federal Communications Commission on March 9, 2016.

References

External links
 Official Website
 

JCD-LP
Radio stations established in 2017
2017 establishments in South Dakota
JCD-LP
Oglala Lakota County, South Dakota